Jabuka, meaning apple in Serbo-Croatian, may refer to:

Places
 Jabuka (island), a Croatian island
 Jabuka, Croatia, a village near Trilj
 Jabuka (mountain), a mountain and plateau on the border between Serbia and Montenegro
 Jabuka, Pančevo, a village in the municipality of Pančevo, Serbia
 Jabuka, Pljevlja, a village in the municipality of Pljevlja, Montenegro
 Kisela Jabuka, North Macedonia
 Jabuka (Prijepolje), a village in the municipality of Prijepolje, Serbia

Bosnia and Herzegovina
 Jabuka, Foča-Uskotlina
 Jabuka, Gacko
 Jabuka (Grude)
 Jabuka (Novo Goražde)
 Jabuka (Sokolac)

Other uses
 Jabuka, an 1894 operetta by Johann Strauss II
 Jabuka TV, a local television station in Zagreb, Croatia

See also

 Crvena jabuka (disambiguation)